Jacqueline Hernández (born January 10) is an American multimedia businesswoman. Hernandez is CEO and co-founder of New Majority Ready, a marketing and strategy firm. She is the former CMO of NBCU Hispanic Enterprise, as well as COO of Telemundo Enterprises. Prior to that, Hernández worked across multiple brands & platforms, including Publisher of People En Español, Teen People, as well as serving in various leadership roles at Time, Fortune, CNN International and Combate Americas.

Personal life 
Hernández was born in New York City, the daughter of Diego and Mercedes Hernández.  She attended high school at Birch Wathen Lenox School in Manhattan, and graduated a year ahead of schedule. During this year, she attended Advanced Placement classes at Cornell in Ithaca, New York. Jacqueline went on to attend Tufts University in Medford, Massachusetts, where she graduated with a B.A. in English and art history in 1988. She later completed graduate studies with a M.B.A. in marketing from Baruch College. She currently lives in New York City with her husband, Jack Rico, a television personality and host of NBC and Telemundo's Consumer 101.

Professional career

Time Inc. 
In 1996, following prior work at The Boston Globe and The Village Voice, Hernández joined Time Inc., where she worked across various divisions of Time Warner. As marketing director of Time Inc. Latin America and International, she received the President's Award, for playing a lead role in the development of the first bilingual media program (in English and Spanish) to reach the Latino audience of Time Inc. media properties including TIME, Asiaweek and Fortune in the US and abroad.

Turner Broadcasting 
Hernández was employed by CNN International, a division of Time, Inc., to oversee the company's international interactive strategy, where she led more than 20 individual country websites, including in-language sites for Latin America (CNNenEspanol.com), Brazil (CNNbrazil.com) and Japan (CNN.co.jp). She was later responsible for managing television and integrated sponsorships on Turner's international media properties, including TNT Latin America and Cartoon Network.

People en Español magazine 
In 2004 Hernández was appointed as publisher of People en Español magazine, her first position with a primary focus on the U.S. Hispanic demographic. The following year, she also took on the role of publisher for Teen People. People en Español, while under her leadership, grew its circulation volume by an annual percentage rate in the double-digits, for three years. In March 2007, the publication was named one of the “Most Notable Magazine Launches of the Past 20 Years” by Media Industry News, while also being listed on Adweek's Hot List "10 under 50" for the fourth consecutive year. Jacqueline also led a relaunch of the magazine's Web site, peopleenespanol.com. As a result of her work during this time, she was named as Adweek's "Marketing y Medios' Executive of the Year" on April 1, 2006 and was also recognized as one of Advertising Age’s ”Women to Watch in 2007.”

Telemundo Enterprises 
In April 2008, Telemundo Media named Jacqueline Hernández as its chief operating officer. Hernández's role at Telemundo has involved establishing a unified approach to marketing for Telemundo across network, television stations and digital platforms. She reorganized the various sales practices under one new umbrella, the “Telemundo Group,” and shortly thereafter was included as one of People en Español's “25 Most Powerful Women" in 2009 and 2011. Hernández also launched several research initiatives including launching the Pulse Research Center, and in May 2010 announcing a psychographic study with Starcom MediaVest Group called 'Beyond Demographics: Identity Study'.

As chief operating officer, Hernández oversees mun2, NBC Universal's cable network targeted to young Latino Americans in the 18-34 age range. In 2010, under Hernández's leadership the network launched a news special called "The New America" which garnered audience appeal, also was re-aired across NBCU on the MSNBC cable television network, one of the first cross-company content collaborations. As of 2010 mun2 has been recognized as being the leading cable network for “bicultural Latinos in the U.S.,” the only network of its type that is measured on a national level. It has also gained recognition based on its programming, having received the NAMIC Award and Peabody Award.

Combate Americas 
As president of Combate Americas, Hernåndez was responsible for the business’ exponential growth through the creation of brand building franchises such as the annual COPA COMBATE which was a country vs. country, 8 man tournament where one athlete took home the grand prize gold cup, as well as ESTRELLAS (All Star annual event) and REINAS, the first all-female women's card.

She was also responsible for the multi-year distribution partnerships with DAZN (OTT Sports provider) and GOL (Spain's leading soccer broadcast network) which transformed Combate Americas from a Spanish language Sports & Entertainment company to a bilingual (Spanish and English) global property.

Under her tenure she was able to grow ratings (beating other well established competitors like Bellator and the UFC in various markets), digital audiences and a global social media partnership with Facebook which led to tens of millions of video views around the world for each event. She was also recognized as one of Cynopsis’ 2019 Leading Women in Sports. She currently continues to serve  the Combate Americas Advisory Board alongside investor and global superstar, Kate Del Castillo.

New Majority Ready 
As Co-Founder and CEO of the  New Majority Ready, the company's mission is to help businesses and brands rethink 'Multicultural' and get New Majority Ready.  To do this the focus is on marketing and content... rigorous analytics and insights, disruptive audience strategies, engaging and relevant content and purposeful causes that generate meaningful connections with consumer social circles and new sources of revenue growth.

Other work

New York City Latin Media and Entertainment Commission 
In 2008, Hernández was appointed as a commissioner of the New York City Latin Media and Entertainment Commission, which, according to the Mayor of New York City Michael Bloomberg, "...was established to showcase our city's Latino arts and entertainment community and create new opportunities and jobs in these fields."

Women of Worth
She has also participated as a judge since 2007 in the L'Oréal “Women of Worth” awards, an annual award program in which ten women every year receive recognition for individual volunteering and community service efforts.

References

Sources

External links 
 Official Twitter page
 Official Facebook page
Media Mogul Jacqueline Hernández: “Brands need to have PURPOSE more than they need to have image campaigns”
Don't Interrupt Me Por Favor Podcast: The Woman Disrupting Mixed Martial Arts
Combate Americas hires former NBCU exec as President
The Mission: Combate Americas Is Changing The Face Of Latino Sports
Combate Americas Becomes First MMA League to Launch a TV Studio
How Combate Américas Is Turning Latino Passion For MMA Into A Profitable Sports And Media Franchise
Combate Americas Teams Up to Encourage Hispanics To Commit To Vote

1966 births
Living people
Tufts University School of Arts and Sciences alumni
Baruch College alumni
American chief operating officers
Birch Wathen Lenox School alumni